Neea acuminatissima is a species of plant in the Nyctaginaceae family. It is found in Guatemala and Honduras.

References

acuminatissima
Endangered plants
Taxonomy articles created by Polbot